Shiyan is a prefecture-level city in northwestern Hubei, China, bordering Henan to the northeast, Chongqing to the southwest, and Shaanxi to the north and west. In 2007, the city was named China's top ten livable cities by Chinese Cities Brand Value Report, which was released at 2007 Beijing Summit of China Cities Forum.

History 
Shiyan was first mentioned by its current name in 1484. After the establishment of the PRC, Shiyan was part of Yun County (nowadays Yunyang District).

During the 1960s, Mao Zedong and other government officials, fearing upheaval and invasion, sought to establish industry in more remote locations. Shiyan, located in a portion of northwest Hubei then known for its poverty, was then a small village comprising a few hundred households. In 1967, teams of workers and engineers were first sent to Shiyan to survey sites for automotive plants and factories (Second Automobile Works, predecessor of Dongfeng Motor Corporation) as part of the Third Front Construction plan. In 1969, Shiyan City was established. By order of Mao in 1969, truck production in Shiyan commenced. Approximately 25,000 construction workers were sent to Shiyan during this time to equip the city with the infrastructure necessary for such project.

In subsequent decades, the city experienced great economic growth due to these facilities, which employed nearly 200,000 workers. However, by the early 1990s, Shiyan was increasingly bypassed for new automotive ventures, which were increasingly located in larger cities with better transport links, although it remained the most prosporous city of Hubei. In 2003, Dongfeng Motors relocated its main passenger car plant to Wuhan, resulting in population decline within Shiyan.

Geography

The Wudang Mountains run east-west through Shiyan. The peak commonly referred to as "Wudang Mountain", or in Mandarin Wudangshan, is one of the most important cultural centres of the Taoist faith. The surrounding areas are dotted with up to 200 Taoist monastic temples and religious sites.  The main attraction in this area, and also one of the most sacred Taoist sites, which forms an important stop for mainly Chinese tourists bound there, with up to twenty bus loads of visitors per day at peak times is Wudangshan Jiedao of the Danjiangkou county-level city.

Major rivers in Shiyan include the Du River and the Han River.

Shiyan's total area is subject to major change as part of the South to North water diversion project of the Han River.

Climate

Administration

The prefecture-level city of Shiyan administers 8 county-level divisions, comprising three districts, one county-level city and four counties:

These eight county-level divisions then administer three different types of township-level divisions: 13 subdistricts, 72 towns, and 34 townships. Finally, these township-level divisions then administer two types of village-level divisions: 164 residential communities and 1,807 administrative villages.

Demographics 
As of 2020, Shiyan's permanent population totals approximately 3,209,000 people. Throughout 2014 to 2019, the city's registered hukou population exceeded the permanent population by a few dozen thousand. This disparity likely represents migrants who left Shiyan, working in larger cities with higher wages, a common trend throughout China. During this span, Shiyan's hukou population decreased by approximately 8,100, but the city's permanent population increased by about 25,300.

Vital statistics 
In 2019, Shiyan saw a birth rate of 11.47‰ (per thousand), and a Death Rate of 7.02‰, giving the city a rate of natural increase of 4.45‰.

52.5% of Shiyan's population is male, and 47.5% is female as of 2019.

Urbanization 
The main urban area of the prefecture-level city of Shiyan is in Maojian District, which is typically labeled on maps simply as "Shiyan". As of 2019, 56.5% of Shiyan's population lived in urban areas, up from 46.3% in 2010.

Income 
In 2019, Shiyan's urban households earned an average of 33,577 renminbi (RMB) in disposable income, a 9.1% increase from 2018. Rural households earned a much lower average disposable income of 11,378 RMB, a 10.5% increase from 2018.

Religion 
Shiyan's city government recognizes 19 religious organizations within the city, which represent 4 religions: Buddhism, Taoism, Islam, and Christianity. Of these organizations, the following 5 serve the entire city: the Shiyan City Buddhist Association, the Shiyan City Islamic Association, the Shiyan City Protestant "Three-Self" Patriotic Movement Committee, the Shiyan City Protestant Association, and the Shiyan City Taoist Association. The remaining 14 serve regions within the city.

Economy

Like China as a whole, Shiyan's economy has experienced rapid substantial growth in the 21st century. The city's gross domestic product (GDP) stood at 201.272 billion renminbi (RMB) in 2019, which is approximately two-thirds larger than the city's GDP just five years earlier. The city's economy consists almost entirely of its secondary and tertiary sectors, which constitute 43.93% and 47.55% of its GDP, respectively. However, as of 2019, 40.2% of Shiyan's population works in the primary sector, whereas just 18.0% works in the secondary sector, and 41.9% work in the tertiary sector.

The city generated 8.119 billion kWh in electricity in 2019, of which, 5.248 kWh was generated in the form of hydropower.

Major heavy industries in Shiyan include cement, which the city producing about 4.13 million tons of in 2019, and steel, which the city produced about 978 thousand tons of in 2019. The production output of both of these industries declined slightly from 2014 to 2019.

Shiyan handed 83.15 million tons of freight in 2019, the vast majority of which was transferred by road.

Automotive industry 
Shiyan is a major center of the automobile industry in China since being chosen as the site of Dongfeng Motors predecessor Second Auto. In Mao’s industrial plan, the Wudang mountains offered the city protection from possible enemy attacks. Starting in the 1960s, the small town grew to a major city as Dongfeng employed up to 200,000 locals and operated almost all major amenities in the city.

It previously served as the headquarters of Dongfeng Motors, a major Chinese truck, bus, and heavy goods vehicle company. Some news outlets have labeled the city as the "Detroit of China", although the nickname has been applied to other Chinese cities, such as Changchun, Chongqing, and nearby Wuhan.

In recent decades, the automotive industry in Shiyan has shrunk, largely due to increasing production in larger cities with better transit links. "Since Dongfeng relocated its main passenger car plant to Wuhan in 2003," the population of Shiyan has been decreasing. The city's production of tires, for instance, has fallen by 48.10% from 2014 to 2019. Car production in the city rose 6.67% during that time, but this number has been volatile depending on the year. In response to the threat of the industry's decline, Shiyan's government has sought to diversify the city's economy, and provide more space for other industrial facilities.

Dongfeng and its partner Renault–Nissan–Mitsubishi Alliance are nowadays producing electric vehicles in Shiyan, including the Renault KZE and Dacia Spring.

Culture 
There are five magazines and seven newspapers in distribution in the city as of 2019.

99.9% of Shiyan's population lives in areas which receive radio and television coverage, and 73.4% of households in Shiyan have a cable television subscription as of 2019.

People from Shiyan traditionally speak in Henan's Nanyang dialect, however due to the large number of migrants, Standard Chinese is commonly spoken.

Education 
As of 2019, Shiyan's educational institutions are staffed by 29,644 full-time teachers, serving approximately 474,200 students.

The city is home to 8 public libraries, which, as of 2019, possess 1,624,090 books, and have distributed 114,622 library cards.

Healthcare 
Shiyan has 2,772 health institutions as of 2019, which includes 59 hospitals. These institutions host a total of 30,634 medical beds.

Transportation

Railway 
Shiyan is located on the Xiangyu Railway between Xiangyang and Chongqing.  Construction on a railway between Shiyan and Yichang is scheduled to begin construction in 2009.

The Wuhan–Shiyan high-speed railway completed track laying in June 2019 and opened to passengers on 29 November 2019.

Highway 

 G59 Hohhot–Beihai Expressway
 G70 Fuzhou–Yinchuan Expressway
 G7011 Shiyan–Tianshui Expressway
China National Highway 209

Air 
A total area of 16400 square meters; a total of one runway with a length of 2600 meters; 7 stops (2 helicopters); and an annual passenger throughput of 1.2 million passengers

Shiyan Wudangshan Airport starts to work in February 2016. Until April 2019, there are total 17 fixed routes, navigating to 26 cities.

Sister city

Shiyan has been a sister city of Craiova, Romania, since December 1999.

References

External links
Government website of Shiyan (available in Chinese and English)

 
Cities in Hubei
Prefecture-level divisions of Hubei